Dreams of Love – Liszt (also known in English as The Loves of Liszt) is a Hungarian-Soviet epic musical/drama produced and directed by Márton Keleti, based on the biography of the Hungarian composer and pianist Franz Liszt.

While the movie was criticized for some of its historical inaccuracies, its epic scope and intense scenes of virtuoso musical performances won wide praise and has been credited with affecting the cultural landscape of the 1970s Eastern Europe.

Plot summary
An epic film about the Hungarian virtuoso pianist and composer Franz Liszt. He is an international star giving performances all over Europe and goes on a concert tour to St. Petersburg, Russia. Liszt's brilliant piano playing impressed the Russian royalty and aristocracy. Even the Russian Tsar stops talking when Liszt plays his piano. Liszt becomes a friend of the Russian composer Glinka. Liszt's beautiful music touches everyone's heart. Women are pursuing him and his lengthy affair with countess Marie d'Agoult is in trouble.

In Russia, Liszt meets the beautiful Princess Carolyne, they fall in love, and she soon leaves her husband for Liszt. She becomes a muse and inspiration for Liszt, and his last and strongest love. Inspired by his love for Carolyne, Liszt creates the most beautiful romantic piano composition, "Liebestraum" (also known as "Dream of Love") dedicated to her, and the piece becomes a classic hit. But the church does not allow Liszt to marry Carolyne, because she could not terminate her first marriage. The unmarried couple moves to the city of Weimar, where Liszt becomes the music director for the royal orchestra. This becomes the most productive and happy period in Liszt's life.

The brilliant pianist and composer Franz Liszt becomes a superstar. He tours many countries and makes people happy with his music, albeit his love life is in trouble. Carolyne cannot terminate her marriage while her husband is alive. Her relatives are against Liszt. She and Liszt remain unmarried, and Liszt suffers from emotional pain until the end of his life. Being loved by the public, Liszt is never really happy in his personal life, so he expresses himself making beautiful music.

Cast 
 Imre Sinkovits as Franz Liszt
 Ariadna Shengelaya as Carolyne zu Sayn-Wittgenstein
 Sándor Pécsi as Gaetano Belloni, Liszt's secretary
 Klara Luchko as Marie d'Agoult
 Igor Dmitriev as prince Nikolay Petrovich Wittgenstein
 Larisa Trembovelskaya as Lola Montez
 Tamás Major as Pope Pius IX
 Klári Tolnay as Cosima, Liszt's daughter
 Lajos Básti as Ágoston Trefort
 Ferenc Bessenyei as Mihály Vörösmarty
 Ádám Szirtes as Miska, Liszt's servant
 Petr Shelokhonov as Mikhail Glinka, Russian composer
 Sándor Suka as Joseph Haydn, Austrian composer
 Natalya Baytalskaya as Vera Timanova
 Gennady Bednostin
 Irina Gubanova as Olga Yanina
 Tibor Bitskey as Liszt's friend
 Kornél Gelley as priest
 Peter Huszti as Franz Joseph I of Austria
 Sergei Ivanov as Nicholas I of Russia
 György Kálmán as police officer
 Sergei Karnovich-Valua as Charles Frederick, Grand Duke of Saxe-Weimar-Eisenach
 Zsolt Kocsy as Franz Liszt in his childhood
 Ivan Kolejev
 Valentin Kulik as Sigismond Thalberg
 Vasili Leonov as Alexander Borodin
 Gábor Mádi Szabó as Liszt's father
 Vera Szemere as Liszt's mother
 László Márkus as Miklós Esterházy
 Sergei Polezhayev as courtier
 Emmanuil Schwarzberg
 Anatoli Shvedersky as Gustav Adolf, Cardinal Prince of Hohenlohe-Schillinsgfürst
 Bertalan Solti
 Géza Tordy as Carl Czerny
 Marina Yurasova as Grand Duchess Maria Pavlovna of Russia
 Éva Ruttkai (voice dubbing for the character of Carolyne in the Hungarian version)
 Ildikó Pécsi (voice dubbing for the character of Lola Montez in the Hungarian version)

Production
 This is a joint Hungarian-Soviet production of MAFILM Studio 3 and Lenfilm Studio.
 Production dates: 1968–1970.
 Filmed in the Soviet Union, East Germany and Hungary.
 Liszt's historic performance in Russia was filmed at St. Petersburg Bolshoi Philharmonic Hall.
 Sviatoslav Richter plays piano for the character of Liszt, including études and the famous "Liebestraum".
 The Hungarian version runtime is 174 minutes. 
 The Soviet version is reduced down to 150 minutes, with some scenes deleted.
 The American version is reduced to 130 minutes, with many scenes deleted.
 Released in 1970 in Hungary and the Soviet Union.
 Released on September 29, 1972, in Finland, and in December 1975, in the USA.

External links 
 
 

1970 films
1970s biographical drama films
Soviet biographical drama films
Russian biographical drama films
Hungary–Soviet Union relations
1970s Hungarian-language films
1970s Russian-language films
1970s romantic musical films
Films set in the 19th century
Films directed by Márton Keleti
Cultural depictions of Franz Liszt
Cultural depictions of Lola Montez
Films about classical music and musicians
Films about composers
Biographical films about musicians
Lenfilm films
Hungarian multilingual films
Soviet multilingual films
1970s multilingual films
Hungarian biographical drama films
1970 drama films